Bryson Cole Sands (born July 17, 1997) is an American professional baseball pitcher for the Minnesota Twins of Major League Baseball (MLB). He made his MLB debut in 2022.

Amateur career
Sands attended North Florida Christian School in Tallahassee, Florida, where he played baseball. As a senior, he pitched to a 0.32 ERA. Following his senior year, he was drafted by the Houston Astros in the 22nd round of the 2015 Major League Baseball draft, but he did not sign, and instead enrolled at Florida State University (FSU) where he played college baseball.

In 2016, as a freshman at FSU, Sands appeared in 18 games (17 starts) in which he pitched to a 6-7 record with a 4.13 ERA over  innings. As a sophomore at FSU, Sands once again pitched in 18 games (making 17 starts), going 6-4 with a 5.40 ERA. In 2016 and 2017, he played collegiate summer baseball for the Falmouth Commodores of the Cape Cod Baseball League. In 2018, his junior season, he made 14 starts and compiled a 7-4 record with a 4.54 ERA, striking out 88 over 75 innings. After the season, he was selected by the Minnesota Twins in the fifth round of the 2018 Major League Baseball draft. He signed for $500,000.

Professional career
Sands made his professional debut in 2019 with the Cedar Rapids Kernels of the Class A Midwest League. After eight starts, he was promoted to the Fort Myers Miracle of the Class A-Advanced Florida State League. After nine starts with the Miracle, he earned another promotion, this time to the Pensacola Blue Wahoos of the Class AA Southern League.  Over 18 starts between the three clubs, Sands went 7-3 with a 2.68 ERA, striking out 108 over  innings. He did not play a minor league game in 2020 since the season was cancelled due to the COVID-19 pandemic. For the 2021 season, Sands was assigned to the Wichita Wind Surge of the Double-A Central. On June 22, he was placed on the injured list with an undisclosed injury, and was activated on July 14. Over 19 games (18 starts) for the 2021 season, Sands went 4-2 with a 2.46 ERA and 96 strikeouts over  innings.

On November 19, 2021, the Twins selected Sands' contract and added him to their 40-man roster. He was assigned to the St. Paul Saints of the Triple-A International League to begin the 2022 season. On April 30, Sands was called up to the major leagues for the first time. He made his MLB debut on May 1, giving up two runs on three hits and two strikeouts over two innings pitched in relief; he was subsequently optioned to St. Paul after the game.

References

External links

1997 births
Living people
Sportspeople from Tallahassee, Florida
Baseball players from Florida
Baseball players from Tallahassee, Florida
Major League Baseball pitchers
Minnesota Twins players
Florida State Seminoles baseball players
Falmouth Commodores players
Cedar Rapids Kernels players
Fort Myers Miracle players
Pensacola Blue Wahoos players
Wichita Wind Surge players
St. Paul Saints players